Farm Boy Inc. is a Canadian food retailer operating in the province of Ontario. The company is based in Ottawa, Ontario. The retailer markets itself as selling fresh produce and food products, with an emphasis in their branding on farm-to-table.

Its current slogan can be found under the Farm Boy sign on its stores, "It's All About The Food."

It was announced in late September 2018 that the company would be acquired by Sobeys' parent, Empire Company Ltd.

History
In December 1981, Collette and Jean-Louis Bellemare opened the first Farm Boy on Cumberland Street in Cornwall, Ontario. At that time, the modest 300 sq. ft. store sold only produce. The original store was moved in 1984 by Jean-Louis and his brother Normand Bellemare. The move to their 5,000 sq. ft. (460 m2) Sydney Street location allowed them to expand their products beyond produce with dairy, deli, cheese, and meat product lines. An in-store bakery and bulk food were later added.

The equity firm Berkshire Partners has been a major investor in the business since late 2012.

Expansion 

By 1992, the success of Farm Boy allowed the family to expand the business into Ottawa. Beginning on Centrum Boulevard in Orleans, the company expanded in Ottawa with eight additional stores by 2007. Store openings included Nepean (1996), Hillside Plaza on Montreal Road (1997), Kanata (1997), Blossom Park (2003), and a second Orleans location (2004). The Ottawa expansion continued with new stores in Barrhaven (2006), Blue Heron Mall on Bank Street (2006), and the Kanata Signature Centre (2007). Ottawa continued gaining Farm Boy locations at Britannia Plaza (2011), Stittsville (2011), Place d'Orleans (2012), which was the first store to offer an in store eating area. 

In the fall of 2003, the Bellemares created a Board of Directors to oversee the overall direction of the company and appointed Jeff York as the new President of Farm Boy in 2009. In 2012, Normand and Daniel Bellemare stepped down as an investment group based in Boston invested in the company to help them grow.

In 2012, Farm Boy expanded to Kingston, Ontario.

In 2014, Farm Boy expanded to London, Ontario. Citing success in its first London location at Wellington Road just north of Bradley Ave, the company announced two more locations would open in the spring of 2015. The first located near CF Masonville Place in the city's north end, and the region's largest store located at Wonderland and Beaverbrook, just west of Western University. The Wonderland and Beaverbrook location is also home to the company's regional offices.

In summer of 2015, Farm Boy furthered its expansion with its first location in Kitchener and Whitby.

In summer of 2016,  another store was opened in the Westboro neighbourhood of Ottawa. This store was meant as an experiment for the company to have a more central location with a greater focus on in-store dining with a larger eating area and "Farm Boy Kitchen" prepared food area.

In July 2017, it was announced that Farm Boy would be taking over part of the former food court location at CF Rideau Centre in downtown Ottawa, which opened mid-December 2017.

On March 1, 2018，Farm Boy opened their first store in Toronto, in the suburb of Etobicoke at Alderwood Plaza.

On March 22, 2018, the company opened their 26th location in Hamilton, Ontario at Harvard Square Plaza.

As of September 2018, the chain had 26 stores and annual sales of CAD$500 million. The Financial Post summarized the store's appeal as, "It’s known for its fresh products, pre-made food, smaller stores and private label products".

As of January 1, 2023, there are 46 Farm Boy locations. The company announced that its focus for future expansion will be on both urban and suburban locations around Ontario. It is planning to open another 3 new locations in 2021, which will include 2 new stores in Toronto.

Sale of the company 
On September 24, 2018, Empire Company Limited, parent of the Sobeys chain of supermarkets, announced that it had signed an agreement to purchase Farm Boy from Berkshire Partners and Farm Boy's management shareholders in a deal worth CAD$800-million. Regulatory approval will be required for the purchase, which was expected to conclude in early 2019.

Farm Boy founder Jean-Louis Bellemare, his co-CEO Jeff York and other members of the senior executives will stay on and will reinvest, to own a 12% share in the new company which will operate as a separate entity. The new ownership will allow Farm Boy to continue with aggressive expansion plans into South-Western Ontario, and in particular the Toronto region. The business was expected to double over the next five years.

Empire had no intention of integrating Farm Boy into their major chains. Michael Medline, President and CEO of Empire Company Limited, assured consumers that they will continue to get the shopping experience that defines Farm Boy. On Twitter, he made this comment in reply to many who had expressed concern: "I can assure you that we will not screw this up". Medline also told analysts in a conference call, "We do not want to ruin the magic of Farm Boy by trying to integrate them. We love what Farm Boy is doing; it has the best brand ... we want to see it grow ... We intend to enable the leadership team of Farm Boy to do what they do best: grow a highly successful retail format at double digit rates". Farm Boy products will not be sold in Empire's other chains nor will Farm Boy stock their brands. Farm Boy products will be included in the Ocado-based e-commerce business that was expected to start in 2020, but as a separate entity from the other Empire chains.

Stores

Barrie
Burlington
Brantford
Cambridge
Cornwall

Guelph
Hamilton
Kingston
Kitchener
London (3)

Newmarket
Oakville
Ottawa (16)
Pickering

Richmond Hill
St. Catharines
Toronto (6)
Waterloo
Whitby

See also
List of Canadian supermarkets

References

External links

Retail companies established in 1981
1981 establishments in Ontario
Supermarkets of Canada
Companies based in Ottawa
Sobeys
Organic food retail organizations
2018 mergers and acquisitions